Amrillo Inoyatov (uzb: Inoyatov Amrillo cycrillic: Иноятов Амрилло Шодиевич born 1979 Bukhara, Uzbekistan) is a Minister at Ministry of Health of the Republic of Uzbekistan

Career 

 2020 - July-November - Deputy Advisor to the President of the Republic of Uzbekistan on youth, science, education, healthcare, culture and sports.
 2020 November - December 2022 - First Deputy Minister of Health of the Republic of Uzbekistan
 30 December 2022 - Minister of Health of the Republic of Uzbekistan

See also 
Ministry of Health (Uzbekistan)

References 

1979 births
Health ministers
Health ministers of Uzbekistan
Government ministers of Uzbekistan
People from Bukhara
Living people